Mouth to Mouth is the fifth studio album by the Levellers. It was released on the China label in 1997 and peaked at #5 in the UK album charts.

Track listing
 "Dog Train"
 "Beautiful Day"
 "Celebrate"
 "Rain and Snow"
 "Far Away"
 "C.C.T.V."
 "Chemically Free"
 "Elation"
 "Captains' Courageous"
 "Survivors"
 "Sail Away"
 "Too Real"

The 2007 re-issue of this album also contained the bonus tracks:
 "Bar Room Jury"
 "Angels"
 "All Your Dreams"
 "Windows"

Personnel

Musicians
 Mark Chadwick - vocals, guitars
 Simon Friend - guitars, vocals, banjo
 Jonathan Sevink - violin, sample loops
 Charlie Heather - drums
 Jeremy Cunningham - bass guitar
 Eddi Reader - backing vocals
 Steve Broughton - keyboards
 Christopher Taylor - percussion
 Marcus McArrol - pedal steel guitar
 The London Metropolitan Orchestra - strings
 The Kick Horns - brass instruments

Production staff
 Jon Kelly - producer
 Andrew Scarth - engineer
 Tim Young - mastering

1997 albums
China Records albums
Levellers (band) albums
Albums produced by Jon Kelly